Hardham Priory was an Augustinian priory in Hardham, West Sussex, England.

It was founded around 1248 by Sir William Dawtrey as a priory of Black Canons of St Augustine which was at first called Heringham Priory. It was enlarged by Sir William Pagnell during the reign of Edward III, but fell into disrepair in the late 15th century and was disbanded in 1534 as part of the Dissolution of the Monasteries.

The refectory building has been converted into a farmhouse, which is a Grade I listed building.

References

Bibliography

Monasteries in West Sussex
Grade I listed buildings in West Sussex